The common name "Chinese clam" may refer to various bivalves originating from south-eastern Asia, e.g.
 Potamocorbula amurensis (overbite clam or Asian clam) of the family Corbulidae
 Sinanodonta woodiana (Chinese pond mussel or Eastern Asiatic freshwater clam) of the family Unionidae
 Sinonovacula constricta (Chinese razor clam or Agemaki clam) of the family Pharidae

See also
China clam